Hopelands is a historic country estate on Wampanoag Road in Warwick, Rhode Island.  It is now the campus of the Rocky Hill School, a private college preparatory school.  The historic centerpiece of the estate is a Colonial Revival mansion house, whose western ell is a wood-frame structure built in 1686.  This house and its associated  property became the center of one of Warwick's first country estates, when in 1793 a Federal-style house was built by Thomas P. Ives and Hope (Brown) Ives, to which the old building was attached.  This was given extensive Colonial Revival treatment in 1885 by Moses Goddard.  The estate was acquired by the Rocky Hill School in 1948.

The estate was listed on the National Register of Historic Places in 1983.

See also

National Register of Historic Places listings in Kent County, Rhode Island
List of the oldest buildings in Rhode Island

References

External links
Rocky Hill School web site

Houses completed in 1686
School buildings on the National Register of Historic Places in Rhode Island
Buildings and structures in Warwick, Rhode Island
National Register of Historic Places in Kent County, Rhode Island
1686 establishments in Rhode Island